Alessandro La Vecchia (born 19 January 1985 in Italy) is an Italian retired footballer.

References

Italian footballers
Living people
1985 births
Association football midfielders
S.S. Racing Club Fondi players
JK Sillamäe Kalev players
Nakhon Si United F.C. players